Achiezer Brandt (born 1938 in Givat Brenner, today in Israel) is an Israeli mathematician, noted for his pioneering contributions to multigrid methods.

Background

Achi Brandt earned his Ph.D. degree at the Weizmann Institute of Science in 1965, under the supervision of Joseph Gillis, with a  thesis on numerical methods in hydrodynamics and magnetohydrodynamics. He is a faculty member of the Weizmann Institute, and has taught at several universities in the United States, including the Courant Institute of Mathematical Sciences and Stanford University.

He is the chief scientist and co-founder (along with Lior Delgo, Eitan Sharon, and Shai Deljo) of VideoSurf, a video-search technology startup, backed by Al Gore.  Microsoft Corp bought the company in 2011.

Awards

He was the recipient of the Landau Prize in Mathematics in 1978 and the Rothschild Prize in Mathematics in 1990. In 2005, he won the  SIAM/ACM Prize in Computational Science and Engineering for "pioneering modern multilevel methods, from multigrid solvers for partial differential equations to multiscale techniques for statistical physics, and for influencing almost every aspect of contemporary computational science and engineering".

References

External links
 
Achi Brandt Weizmann Institute

1938 births
Living people
People from Givat Brenner
20th-century Israeli mathematicians
21st-century Israeli  mathematicians
Academic staff of Weizmann Institute of Science
Fellows of the Society for Industrial and Applied Mathematics
Courant Institute of Mathematical Sciences faculty